Federal Motor Vehicle Safety Standard 226 (FMVSS 226) regulates automotive ejection mitigation in the United States.   Like all other Federal Motor Vehicle Safety Standards, FMVSS 226 is administered by the United States Department of Transportation's National Highway Traffic Safety Administration.

This standard establishes requirements for ejection mitigation systems to reduce the likelihood of complete and partial ejections of vehicle occupants through side windows during rollovers or side impact events.

Phase-in schedule

See also
 Airbag
 FMVSS

References

External links
 http://www.nhtsa.gov/staticfiles/nvs/pdf/TP-226_Ejection_v00_March_2011.pdf 
 http://www.nhtsa.gov/staticfiles/rulemaking/pdf/Ejection_mitigation_FR_Jan2011.pdf

Automotive safety
Automotive standards
Standards of the United States